Ugly Is Beautiful is the debut major-label studio album by American singer-songwriter Oliver Tree. The album was originally scheduled for release on March 27, 2020 and delayed to June 12, 2020 through Atlantic Records, before being delayed again and released on July 17, 2020. In addition to Tree himself, the album features production from Andrew Goldstein, David Pramik, Marshmello, NVDES, Rogét Chahayed, Stint, and frequent collaborator Whethan, among others. The album debuted at number 14 on the Billboard 200 and number one on the Top Rock Albums chart. A deluxe version titled Ugly Is Beautiful: Shorter, Thicker & Uglier was released on May 28, 2021.

Background 
Tree began hinting at Ugly Is Beautiful shortly after the release of the single "Hurt" in December 2018. He then embarked on a tour of the same name as the album. On August 2, 2019 he released Do You Feel Me?, an EP that contains six songs, four of which appear on Ugly Is Beautiful.

On December 6, 2019, Tree released the single "Cash Machine", and announced that Ugly Is Beautiful would be released on March 27, 2020. However, on March 25, just two days before the initial release date, it was announced that the album had been delayed due to the COVID-19 pandemic. Tree announced jokingly that due to the pandemic, the album had been cancelled and that while he still planned to release it "within the next 5-10 years", for now he was "officially going into retirement".

On April 7, 2020, Tree released "Let Me Down", which he jokingly announced as his "final song and video ever". However, on May 19, 2020, following a brief social media blackout, he posted an Instagram live video on his account that showed him being "kidnapped" by someone, as well as a picture of Ugly Is Beautifuls album cover. The "kidnapper" then stated that if the post with his album cover got to 100,000 comments, he would reveal the release date for the album. The post made it to 100,000 comments in about 45 minutes only for the comment goal to be updated to 250,000, which was also reached. The "kidnapper" then updated the comment goal to 500,000, then to 1,000,000. Finally, once this goal was reached, a video was posted to Instagram in which Oliver announced that Ugly Is Beautiful would be released on June 12. Tree then stated that if the album cover post reached 2,000,000 comments, he would release a new song and music video. The post reached this goal on May 25, and the next day, on May 26, he released the single "Bury Me Alive" along with pre-orders and a release date for the album for June 12, 2020.

On June 8, 2020, Tree announced that he had decided to delay the album yet again, due to the issues of racism and police violence against black people going on at the time after the murder of George Floyd, and the protests surrounding it. He stated that he "did not believe it was an appropriate time" to release the album when "much bigger things" deserved attention. The new release date was revealed to be July 17.

On July 14, 2020, the tracklist for the album was revealed. 

 Deluxe version 
On May 28, 2021, a deluxe version of the album titled Ugly Is Beautiful: Shorter, Thicker & Uglier was released featuring seven tracks not included on the standard version, including the singles "Out of Ordinary" and "Life Goes On". The cover is slightly altered, with the same image of Tree holding balloons behind a fire, but instead smiling.

 Promotion 
Tree promoted Ugly Is Beautiful with the graphic novel Oliver Tree vs. Little Ricky: Alien Boys from Z2 Comics.

Critical reception

Ugly Is Beautiful received mixed reviews from music critics. Ben Jolley of NME said that "beyond the fuzzy guitars and old-school hip-hop beats, Tree's thought-provoking narrative – which tackles depression, loneliness, commercialism, bullying and ignoring haters – proves he's more than a piss-taking internet troll" and that the album "just about silences his credibility critics by delivering wall-to-wall pop-rock ragers while encouraging fans to be unashamedly themselves". However, Cat Zhang of Pitchfork wrote that "for an artist chasing shock and bombast, Oliver Tree's music is surprisingly tame" and criticized the album's length and Tree's voice which "is riddled with distortion, casting a fuzzed-out sameness over even the more left-field selections". Zhang said that Tree's lyrics "indicate deeper struggle behind Tree's ludicrous facade, touching on the same themes of being an outsider, fucking up, and dealing with negativity, although in the vaguest possible terms" but that they appeared heartfelt. She concluded that "the album contains glimmers of a better artist" but was unsure how much of Tree's persona was down to him or other people.

 Track listing Notes  signifies a co-producer.

 Personnel 
Credits adapted from Tidal.Musicians Oliver Tree Nickell – vocals
 Ricky Robinson – violin 
 Andrew Goldstein – guitar, keyboards, programming Technical'

 Michelle Mancini – mastering
 Mike Freesh – mixing
 Jacob Dennis – engineering 
 Zaire Koalo – engineering 
 Trevor Brown – engineering 
 Iain Findlay – engineering 
 MacGregor Leo – engineering 
 Stint – engineering 
 Matt Dyson – engineering

Charts

Weekly charts

Year-end charts

Certifications

References

External links 

 

2020 debut albums
Albums postponed due to the COVID-19 pandemic
Oliver Tree albums